Fam Islands are a group of islands in the Raja Ampat Archipelago, which are administered as part of the Indonesian province of Southwest Papua. The main islands are Fam, Penemu (Fam Besar), Inus and Yar. They lie northwest of Batanta island, in the straits between Waigeo and Batanta and New Guinea.

References 

Archipelagoes of Indonesia
Raja Ampat Islands
Islands of Indonesia
Uninhabited islands of Indonesia